Edouard (Edward) d'Evry FRCO, FTCL (6 June 1869 — 25 December 1950) was an organist and composer. He was Assistant Organist of the Brompton Oratory, London from 1893 to 1899, and Organist there from 1899 to 1935.

He preceded Ralph Downes as Organist of the Brompton Oratory and wrote a number of pieces for organ in varying styles over a period of more than 50 years. He was also Controller of Examinations for the Trinity College of Music in London. His choral setting of O sacrum convivium is often performed to this day.

External links

References

1869 births
1950 deaths
English classical organists
British male organists
Alumni of Trinity College of Music
20th-century classical musicians
20th-century English musicians
20th-century organists
20th-century British male musicians
Male classical organists